The Sharjah Biennial is a large-scale contemporary art exhibition that takes place once every two years in the city of Sharjah, United Arab Emirates. The first Sharjah Biennial took place in 1993, and was organized by the Sharjah Department of Culture and Information until it is reorientation in 2003 by Hoor bint Sultan Al Qasimi.

History

2005 – Sharjah Biennial 7
The 7th edition, titled Belonging, was curated by Jack Persekian, Ken Lum and Tirdad Zolghadr. and took place between 6 April to 6 June 2005. The exhibition centred on the issues of 'belonging, identity and cultural location'.

2007 – Sharjah Biennial 8
Still Life: Art, Ecology, and the Politics of Change was curated by Mohammed Kazem, Jonathan Watkins, and Eva Scharrer. The exhibition was hosted between 4 April to 4 June 2007 at Sharjah Art Museum, Expo Centre Sharjah, Heritage Area, American University of Sharjah & several outdoor locations in Sharjah.

2009 - Sharjah Biennial 9

The 9th Sharjah Biennial's exhibition programme Provisions For The Future was curated by Isabel Carlos, and the performance and film programme Past Of The Coming Days was curated by Tarek Abou El Fetouh. The exhibition was hosted between 19 March to 16 May 2009.

Participating artists at SB9 included Hamra Abbas, Diana Al-Hadid, Firoz Mahmud, Halil Altindere, Juan Araújo, Tarek Atoui, Lili Dujourie, Hala Elkoussy, Ayse Erkmen, Amir H. Fallah, Lara Favaretto, Lamya Gargash, Mariam Ghani, Simryn Gill, Sheela Gowda, Laurent Grasso, NS Harsha, Joana Hadjithomas & Khalil Joreige, Lamia Joreige, Nadia Kaabi-Linke, Hayv Kahraman, Nadia Kaabi Linke, Maider López, Liliana Porter, Karin Sander, Liu Wei, Lawrence Weiner, Yonamine, Nika Oblak & Primõz Novak, Basma Al-Sharif, Nida Sinnokrot, David Spriggs, and Lawrence Weiner among others.

2011 – Sharjah Biennial 10
Plot for a Biennial, the 10th edition of the biennial, was curated by Suzanne Cotter and Rasha Salti, alongside Haig Aivazian, and was hosted from 16 March through to 16 May 2011. SB10 covered the so-called Arab Spring, the movement aspiring for political change that had been ongoing in various Arabic countries for several months around that period. The biennial was hosted across several venues in the heart of Sharjah, including landmarks of Emirati architecture and Sharjah’s historic Cricket Stadium. The exhibition included 119 artists and participants from 36 countries across the globe.

2013 – Sharjah Biennial 11
The 11th edition of the biennial, Re:emerge: Towards a New Cultural Cartography, was hosted between 13 March to 13 May 2013 and was curated by Yuko Hasegawa, chief curator of the Museum of Contemporary Art in Tokyo.

Participating artists included: Ravi Agarwal, Nevin Aladag, Francis Alÿs, Jananne Al-Ani, Alfredo & Isabel Aquilizan, Matthew Barney and Elizabeth Peyton, Luz Maria Bedoya, David Claerbout, Olafur Eliasson, Monir Shahroudy Farmanfarmaian, Shilpa Gupta, Yu-ichi Inoue, Lamia Joreige, Jesper Just, Amar Kanwar, Kan Xuan, Pablo Lobato, Basir Mahmood, Cinthia Marcelle, Taus Makhacheva, Angelica Mesiti, Otobong Nkanga, Gabriel Orozco, Khaled Sabsabi, Pascale Marthine Tayou, and Fumito Urabe.

2015 – Sharjah Biennial 12

The past, the present, the possible, curated by Eungie Joo, took place at public spaces around the Sharjah Art Museum, the Sharjah Art Foundation offices and Al Mureijah heritage area. The 12th Biennial was held between 5 March — 5 June 2015.

2017 – Sharjah Biennial 13 
The 13th Biennial, titled Tamawuj, was curated by Christine Tohmé and opened on 10 March 2017 with exhibitions in Sharjah and Beirut, alongside projects in Dakar, Ramallah, and Istanbul from October 2017 through January 2018.

2019 – Sharjah Biennial 14 
The 14th Biennial, Leaving the Echo Chamber, was curated by Zoe Butt, Omar Kholeif and Claire Tancons. The exhibition opened at Sharjah Art Foundation premises on 7 March 2019, and ran until 10 June 2019.

2023 - Sharjah Biennial 15
The 15th Biennial,  Thinking Historically in the Present was curated by Sheikha Hoor Al Qasimi and she also is the director of Sharjah Art Foundation . The exhibition opened at Sharjah Art Foundation premises, including the Kalba Ice Factory, inaugurated to house Biennial 15 exhibits, on 7 February 2023. 

The 15th Sharjah Biennial featured the following artists: Basel Abbas and Ruanne Abou-Rahme, Maitha Abdalla, Fathi Afifi, Hoda Afshar, John Akomfrah, Hangama Amiri, Brook Andrew, Malala Andrialavidrazana, Rushdi Anwar, Kader Attia, Au Sow Yee, Dana Awartani, Omar Badsha, Natalie Ball, Sammy Baloji, Mirna Bamieh, Pablo Bartholomew and Richard Bartholomew, Shiraz Bayjoo, Bahar Behbahani, Asma Belhamar, Rebecca Belmore, Black Grace, Diedrick Brackens, Maria Magdalena Campos-Pons, Cao Fei, Carolina Caycedo, Ali Cherri, Wook-kyung Choi, Iftikhar Dadi and Elizabeth Dadi, Solmaz Daryani, Annalee Davis, Destiny Deacon, Manthia Diawara, Imane Djamil, Anju Dodiya, Kimathi Donkor, Heri Dono, Rehab Eldalil, Ali Eyal, Marianne Fahmy, Brenda Fajardo, Raheleh Filsoofi, Nina Fischer and Maroan el Sani, Coco Fusco, Flavia Gandolfo, Theaster Gates, Gabriela Golder, Gabrielle Goliath, Yulia Grigoryants, Joana Hadjithomas and Khalil Joreige, Hassan Hajjaj, David Hammons, Archana Hande, Fathi Hassan, Mona Hatoum, Rachid Hedli, Lubaina Himid, Laura Huertas Millán, Saodat Ismailova, Isaac Julien, Saddam Jumaily, Patricia Kaersenhout, Robyn Kahukuiwa, Reena Saini Kallat, Hanni Kamaly, Amar Kanwar, Adam Khalil and Bayley Sweitzer with Oba, Bouchra Khalili, Naiza Khan, Tania El Khoury, Kiluanji Kia Henda, Ayoung Kim, Emily Kame Kngwarreye, Hiroji Kubota, Nusra Latif Qureshi, Lee Kai Chung, Faustin Linyekula, Ibrahim Mahama, Nabil El Makhloufi, Jawad Al Malhi, Waheeda Malullah, Maharani Mancanagara, mandla, Lavanya Mani, Kerry James Marshall, Moza Almatrooshi, Queenie McKenzie, Steve McQueen, Marisol Mendez, Almagul Menlibayeva, Helina Metaferia, Kimowan Metchewais, Meleanna Meyer, Joiri Minaya, Tahila Mintz, Roméo Mivekannin, Tracey Moffat, Aline Motta, Marwah AlMugait, Wangechi Mutu, Eubena Nampitjin, Dala Nasser, New Red Order, Pipo Nguyen-Duy, Mame-Diarra Niang, Shelley Niro, Thenjiwe Niki Nkosi, Elia Nurvista, Okwui Okpokwasili, Kambui Olujimi, Zohra Opoku, Erkan Özgen, Pak Khawateen Painting Club, Pushpakanthan Pakkiyarajah, Hyesoo Park, Philippe Parreno, Angela Ponce, Prajakta Potnis, Anita Pouchard Serra, Jasbir Puar and Dima Srouji, Monira Al Qadiri, Farah Al Qasimi, Michael Rakowitz, Umar Rashid, Wendy Red Star, Veronica Ryan, Doris Salcedo, Abdulrahim Salem, Sangeeta Sandrasegar, Varunika Saraf, Khadija Saye, Berni Searle, Mithu Sen, Nelly Sethna, Aziza Shadenova, Smita Sharma, Nilima Sheikh, Yinka Shonibare, Felix Shumba, Semsar Siahaan, Mary Sibande, Kahurangiariki Smith, Mounira Al Solh, Inuuteq Storch, Vivan Sundaram, Pamela Phatsimo Sunstrum, Obaid Suroor, Hank Willis Thomas, Akeim Toussaint Buck, Hajra Waheed, Barbara Walker, Wang Jianwei, Nari Ward, Carrie Mae Weems and Nil Yalter.

See also 

Sharjah Art Foundation
March Meeting

References 

1993 establishments in the United Arab Emirates
Arab art scene
Art biennials
Art festivals in the United Arab Emirates
Contemporary art exhibitions
Events in the United Arab Emirates
Recurring events established in 1993
Sharjah (city)
Spring (season) events in the United Arab Emirates